Margaret Hendry (11 May 1930 – 20 March 2001) was a landscape architect, one of the first women to work in this field in Australia. She worked for the National Capital Development Commission in Canberra from 1963 to 1974 and later lectured at the Canberra College of Advanced Education (now the University of Canberra).

Achievement and honours 
She graduated from Burnley Horticultural College in 1948-very unusual for a woman at that time-and completed a diploma in landscape design at the Kings College, Durham University in the late 1950s.

From 1963 to 1974 Margaret was employed by the National Capital Development Commission to work on the landscape development of Canberra as a garden city.

Margaret presented a paper at the Australian Garden Historical Society conference in the mid-1990s on the landscape development for the parliamentary area.

In 1992, Hendry was awarded the Medal of the Order of Australia for her service to women's affairs.

Legacy 
An annual lecture on landscape architecture is hosted by the Australian Institute of Landscape Architects.

Margaret Hendry School, a primary school in the suburb on Taylor, opened in 2019 and is named in her honour.

1997 appointed to the Australian Capital Territory Heritage Council.

References 

Australian landscape architects
Women landscape architects
1930 births
2001 deaths
Recipients of the Medal of the Order of Australia